Liu Xinyun (born September 1962) is a former Chinese politician who spent most of his career in his home-province Shandong. He was investigated by China's top anti-graft agency in April 2021. In September 2022, he was sentenced to 14 years in prison for bribery and abuse of power. Previously he served as vice governor of Shanxi and head of Shanxi Public Security Department. Liu is the latest senior-ranking police officer to be investigated in a years-long anti-corruption battle started by Chinese Communist Party general secretary Xi Jinping that is now sweeping China's domestic security apparatus.

Career
Liu was born in Zibo, Shandong, in September 1962. After the resumption of college entrance examination, he was admitted to Shandong Police College in September 1979. After graduating in July 1981, he was assigned to Zibo Public Security Bureau. He rose to become deputy head in July 1997 and political commissar in December 2002. In December 2005, he was transferred to Heze and appointed assistant mayor and head of the Public Security Bureau. He was assigned to the similar position of the capital city Jinan in December 2011. He became director of the Network Security Bureau of the Public Security Ministry and director of the National Network and Information Security Information Notification Center in December 2014, and served until January 2018, when he was transferred from his job in Beijing to central Shanxi province as vice governor of Shanxi and head of the Public Security Department.

Downfall
On April 9, 2021, he was put under investigation for alleged "serious violations of discipline and laws" by the Central Commission for Discipline Inspection (CCDI), the party's internal disciplinary body, and the National Supervisory Commission, the highest anti-corruption agency of China. On August 15, he was expelled from the Communist Party of China (CPC) and dismissed from public office. On August 26, he has been arrested on charges of bribery and abuse of power as per a decision made by the Supreme People's Procuratorate. On October 9, he was indicted on charges of bribery and abuse of power by the Langfang Municipal People's Procuratorate.

On September 21, 2022, Liu Xinyun was sentenced to 14 years in prison for bribery, abuse of power, and damaging the interests of the people. He was also fined one million yuan.

References

1962 births
Living people
People from Zibo
People's Republic of China politicians from Shandong
Chinese Communist Party politicians from Shandong
Expelled members of the Chinese Communist Party
Chinese politicians convicted of corruption